Fayetteville Township may refer to the following townships in the United States:

 Fayetteville Township, Washington County, Arkansas
 Fayetteville Township, St. Clair County, Illinois